Bil'in was a Palestinian Arab village in the Gaza Subdistrict. It was depopulated by the Israel Defense Forces during the 1948 Arab–Israeli War on July 8, 1948, under Operation An-Far. It was located 39 km northeast of Gaza and the village contained two wells which supplied it with drinking water.

History
In 1838 it was noted as a Muslim village, Ba'lin, in the Gaza district, being smaller than  nearby Barqusya.

In 1863 Victor Guérin  noted it as a small village on a mound.

In 1882, the PEF's Survey of Western Palestine described it as being a small  adobe village, "with no traces of antiquity."

British Mandate era
In the 1922 census of Palestine conducted by the British Mandate authorities, Bil'in had a population of 101 Muslims, increasing by the 1931 census to 127, still all Muslim, in 32 houses.

In  the 1945 statistics,  the village together with Ard el Ishra had a population of 180 Muslims,  and the  land area was 8,036   dunams, according to an official land and population survey.

Bi'lin had an elementary school which was founded in 1937 and a shrine for al-Shaykh Ya'qub.

Post 1948

Qedma started using some of the village land after 1948.

In 1992 the village site was described: "All that remains is the rubble of a few houses, with wild herbs and thorns growing on the site, along with some trees and cactus plants. The site is surrounded by barbed wire. Parts of the surrounding land are planted with mango trees and grapes, while others serve as pastures."

References

Bibliography

External links
Welcome To Bi'lin
Bi'lin, Zochrot
Survey of Western Palestine, Map 16:   IAA, Wikimedia commons
Bi'lin, from the Khalil Sakakini Cultural Center

Arab villages depopulated during the 1948 Arab–Israeli War
District of Gaza